The southern mole vole (Ellobius fuscocapillus) is a species of rodent in the family Cricetidae.
It is found in Afghanistan, Iran, Pakistan, and Turkmenistan.

Chromosomes
Southern mole voles are the only member of Ellobius demonstrated to have both a normal XY/XX chromosomal sex determination system and an SRY gene.

References

Ellobius
Mammals of Afghanistan
Fauna of Iran
Mammals of Pakistan
Mammals described in 1843
Taxa named by Edward Blyth
Taxonomy articles created by Polbot